Take Them and Break Them is a Japanese only exclusive EP by Finnish glam rock singer Michael Monroe, released on April 24, 2002. The EP features six tracks: two exclusive studio tracks and four live tracks, and was released through the Japanese label Nippon Crown.

Three of the live tracks: "Where's the Fire John?", "Relationship Wrecked" and "Make It Go Away", have previously appeared on Monroe's 1996 album Peace of Mind. The fourth live track, "Just Because You're Paranoid", has appeared on the 1999 album Life Gets You Dirty.

Track listing

Michael Monroe albums
2002 EPs